Darryl Dickson-Carr (born 1968) is an American author, professor, and literary critic.

Life
Dr. Dickson-Carr graduated from University of California, Santa Barbara, with a Ph.D. in English with a focus on African American satire.
He taught at Florida State University before joining the English faculty at Southern Methodist University, where he currently teaches and serves as interim Director of Graduate Studies.

Awards
 2006 American Book Award, for The Columbia Guide to Contemporary African American Fiction

Works

 "The Projection of the Beast: Subverting Mythologies in Toni Morrison’s Jazz.”, CLA Journal 49:2 (December 2005). 168-83.
 “Introduction.” Ebony Rising: Short Fiction from the Greater Harlem Renaissance Era, 1912-1940, Craig Gable ed. Indiana University Press, 2004.

References

External links
 African-American literature

1968 births
American editors
University of California, Santa Barbara alumni
Florida State University faculty
Southern Methodist University faculty
Living people
American Book Award winners